Głogusz  is a village in the administrative district of Gmina Sulechów, within Zielona Góra County, Lubusz Voivodeship, in western Poland.

The village has an approximate population of 100.

References

Villages in Zielona Góra County